Vernon Leslie Morris (13 June 1900 – 11 January 1973) was a Welsh cricketer. Morris was a right-handed batsman who bowled right-arm medium pace. Morris was born at Briton Ferry, Glamorgan.

Morris made his debut for Glamorgan in the 1920 Minor Counties Championship against Wiltshire. With Glamorgan's elevation to first-class status, he made his first-class debut against Worcestershire in 1921.  From 1921 to 1929, he represented Glamorgan in 18 first-class matches, with his final match for the county coming against the touring South Africans. In his 18 first-class matches, he scored 407 runs at a batting average of 12.71, with a high score of 42.  In the field he took 9 catches.

Morris died at Exmouth, Devon on 11 January 1973. His son Robert Morris played first-class cricket for Cambridge University and Kent.

References

External links

19th-century births
1973 deaths
Cricketers from Briton Ferry
Welsh cricketers
Glamorgan cricketers